A competitive pace race is a timed race in which the objective is not to finish in the least time, but to finish within the prescribed time and in the best physical condition.  In some races, the prescribed time is very narrowly defined and the winner is the competitor who finishes closest to the prescribed time.  In other races, the prescribed time is a "window" and competitors who finish outside the window (too early or too late) are penalized or disqualified.

As a rule, pace races use staggered starts.

Example precision pace races
The Great Race (classic rally)

Example window pace races
Competitive trail riding: NATRC and SEDRA

See also
 Classic rally
 Racing

Racing